Michael Brooke (born 29 November 1952) is a New Zealand cricketer. He played in one List A match for Central Districts in 1971/72.

See also
 List of Central Districts representative cricketers

References

External links
 

1952 births
Living people
New Zealand cricketers
Central Districts cricketers
Cricketers from Wellington City